The 2018–19 season of the Frauen-Bundesliga was the 29th season of Germany's premier women's football league. It ran from 15 September 2018 to 12 May 2019.

VfL Wolfsburg won their third straight and fifth overall title.

Teams

Team changes

Stadiums

League table

Results

Top scorers

References

External links
Weltfussball.de
DFB.de

2018-19
2018–19 in German women's football leagues